Jana vandeschricki is a moth in the family Eupterotidae. It was described by Lucien A. Berger in 1980. It is found in Katanga Province of the Democratic Republic of the Congo.

References

Moths described in 1980
Janinae